Jonathan Mark Timmons (born February 21, 1991, in Los Angeles, California), also known as Jon Timmons as his screen name is a Filipino American actor, model and television personality. He is the oldest member of the home group That's My Bae and he is also seen in the noontime variety show Eat Bulaga!.

Personal life

He was an AA Science graduate at El Camino College in Los Angeles before joining That's My Bae. In California, he also had a part-time job as a cashier at a mall and then at a pet store. Timmons was simply visiting the Philippines when he joined That's My Bae: "Twerk It" Dance Contest to try his luck in the Philippine showbiz industry. After becoming part of That's My Bae, he decided to stay in the Philippines.

Career

Filmography

See also 
 Kim Last
 Kenneth Medrano
 Miggy Tolentino
 That's My Bae

Notes

References

External links
 

Living people
1991 births
Filipino male television actors
TV5 (Philippine TV network) personalities
GMA Network personalities